Lazy Mountain is a census-designated place (CDP) in Matanuska-Susitna Borough, Alaska, United States. Located east of Palmer along the Matanuska River. At the 2020 census the population was 1,506, up from 1,479 in 2010.

Geography

The southern boundary of the CDP starts at the Old Glenn Highway where it meets E. Smith Rd, extends east along the Smith Road extension to Harmony Avenue, then south one block to Purser Place and then east again approximately 1/2 mile along an imaginary line to McRoberts Creek.  McRoberts Creek forms the southeast boundary of the CDP up to its headwaters and to the top of the ridge south of Matanuska Peak.  The east boundary forms an irregular line along the ridge to Matanuska Peak, then down to the glacier and along its outfall creek to where it meets Wolverine Creek.

Climate
Lazy Mountain has a continental subarctic climate (Köppen Dfc) with cold, snowy winters and mild summers.

Demographics

Lazy Mountain first appeared on the 1990 U.S. Census as a census-designated place (CDP).

As of the census of 2000, there were 1,158 people, 410 households, and 303 families residing in the CDP. There were 465 housing units at an average density of 13.1/sq mi (5.1/km2). The racial makeup of the CDP was 92.66% White, 0.09% Black or African American, 2.94% Native American, 1.04% Asian, 0.17% from other races, and 3.11% from two or more races.  1.04% of the population were Hispanic or Latino of any race.

There were 410 households, out of which 40.7% had children under the age of 18 living with them, 63.7% were married couples living together, 6.6% had a female householder with no husband present, and 25.9% were non-families. 20.2% of all households were made up of individuals, and 5.6% had someone living alone who was 65 years of age or older.  The average household size was 2.82 and the average family size was 3.30.

In the CDP, the population was spread out, with 31.6% under the age of 18, 5.7% from 18 to 24, 27.9% from 25 to 44, 28.2% from 45 to 64, and 6.6% who were 65 years of age or older.  The median age was 36 years. For every 100 females, there were 114.4 males.  For every 100 females age 18 and over, there were 111.2 males.

The median income for a household in the CDP was $46,500, and the median income for a family was $54,881. Males had a median income of $37,179 versus $28,889 for females. The per capita income for the CDP was $22,789.  About 3.3% of families and 7.8% of the population were below the poverty line, including 9.4% of those under age 18 and none of those age 65 or over.

Government
As a Census Designated Place, the Lazy Mountain Area is not a traditional village or town. It lies to the East of the nearest municipal area, Palmer.   The area is part of the Matanuska-Susitna Borough, and as such is subject to borough control.  The Lazy Mountain Community Council, which represents a similar but slightly smaller area than the Lazy Mountain CDP, provides feedback to the borough from some of the residents of the area.
The Lazy Mountain Community Council submitted a Comprehensive Plan to the Borough Assembly and it adopted by the Assembly in 2008.

Parks and recreation

Parks, gardens, and wildlife refuges

Recreational facilities
The Lazy Mountain Recreation Area is a 360-acre site which has hiking/skiing and equestrian trails. The parking area at the East end of Huntley Road provides access to the Morgan Horse, Lazy Moose and Lazy Mountain Trails.

Transportation

Roads
The Lazy Mountain area is only accessible by road from along the Old Glenn Highway, formerly Alaska Route 1.  This section of the Glenn Highway was bypassed when the Glenn Highway was rerouted across the Knik and Matanuska Rivers and the Palmer Hay Flats in 1976. The Old Glenn Highway is now reached from the south at an interchange off of the Glenn Highway at milepost 29.6, or from Palmer where the Old Glenn becomes Arctic Avenue.  The Old Glenn Highway is classed as a major collector South of Clark-Wolverine Road, and as a minor arterial from that point north into Palmer.

East Smith Road, which forms the southern boundary of the Lazy Mountain CDP, is considered a minor collector road for the first 1/2 mile from the Old Glenn Highway, as is Clark-Wolverine Road from the Old Glenn Highway all the way to where it becomes Wolverine Road, and on to N. McKenzie Drive

Air transport
The Lazy Mountain Area is served by numerous private airports.  The following airports are registered with the FAA

Identifier   Name
 AK46   ABI Airport
 AK88   Eagle Nest Airport
 AK92   Martin Field
 7AK9   Vinduska Airport

and one Heliport
 5AK4   Eagles Nest Heliport

At least three other unregistered landing areas exist in the Lazy Mountain area, one along the Old Glenn Highway between Eugene Drive and Clark-Wolverine Rd. and two near Huntley Road.

The nearest public airport is the Palmer Municipal Airport (PAQ).

Effective May 29, 2014 all airports in the Lazy Mountain area use a single common traffic advisory frequency (CTAF), 123.60 MHz.
The nearest airport with scheduled commercial service is the Ted Stevens Anchorage International Airport (ANC).

Notable people
 Anna Marly, Russian-French singer-songwriter (1917-2006). Settled in Lazy Mountain where she became US Citizen and died in Palmer.

References

Census-designated places in Matanuska-Susitna Borough, Alaska
Census-designated places in Alaska
Anchorage metropolitan area